{{DISPLAYTITLE:C13H21NO3}}
The molecular formula C13H21NO3 (molar mass : 239.31 g/mol, exact mass : 239.152144) may refer to:

 AEM (psychedelic)
 Asymbescaline
 2C-O-4
 3C-E
 2,5-Dimethoxy-4-ethoxyamphetamine
 EMM (psychedelic)
 Isoetarine
 Isoproscaline
 Levomoprolol
 Levosalbutamol
 Metaproscaline
 MME (psychedelic)
 Moprolol
 Proscaline
 Salbutamol
 Symbescaline